Shree Siddheshwar Temple is Lord Siddheshwar (Shiva) Temple located at Balni, Karwar and built and managed by Mirasdars.

Hindu temples in Uttara Kannada district
Shiva temples in Karnataka
Karwar